Michael Barrett Watson (born April 23, 1974) is an American actor known for his roles of Matt Camden on 7th Heaven, Brian Davis in What About Brian, Todd Deepler in Samantha Who? and Lachlan Murdoch in The Loudest Voice.

Early life
Watson was one of four children of Karen, a paralegal, and Michael Watson, an attorney. At the age of 8, Watson and his family moved to Dallas, Texas, where he began his modeling career. For a period of time, he studied acting at the Dallas Young Actors Studio with director Linda Seto. Watson was 14 when his parents divorced. When he was 15, he moved to Burbank, California, where he immediately landed a six-month contract on the soap opera Days of Our Lives. After his contract ended, Watson moved back to Texas and graduated from Richardson High School in 1992.

Career
When he turned 19, Watson moved back to Los Angeles, where he worked parking cars at a House of Blues nightclub while auditioning for roles. He landed guest spots in several television series such as Baywatch and Sister, Sister. Eventually he was chosen for a minor role on the Aaron Spelling series Malibu Shores. Though his role was brief, it led him to Aaron Spelling's next project, 7th Heaven.

It was on The WB's 7th Heaven that Watson finally gained much recognition for his portrayal as Matt Camden. Watson said in 2016 that his mindset at the time was one of wanting to get paid despite his unsureness in the project or why the people involved wanted him to participate in the first place. He stopped being a full-time regular after the sixth season, but continued to guest star on the show until its 10th season. In his break from acting on 7th Heaven, he was brought in to write an episode by series creator and producer Brenda Hampton. He did not appear at all during the eleventh and final season.

In 1999, he starred in his first feature film with fellow WB star Katie Holmes in Teaching Mrs. Tingle. Watson hoped that his role in the film would help him avoid being pigeonholed by his role in 7th Heaven. During the production, Watson felt "strange" at times due to his being the only male on set, but had "an amazing experience" working with his co-stars. Watson directed two episodes of 7th Heaven in 2005, and likewise directed one episode of The Secret Life of the American Teenager in 2010.

In 2002, Watson had a starring role as Dave and his alter ego Daisy in Sorority Boys; his performance was met with a mixed reception amid the film being panned. In a negative review, Lindy Keffer of pluggedin.com lamented that Watson's presence in the film would bring it additional attention. 
 
On April 16, 2006, Watson starred as the lead character, Brian Davis, in the ABC series What About Brian. The show ended its run on March 26, 2007. Watson also starred as Todd in the ABC series Samantha Who? In 2011, he played Pax in My Future Boyfriend, an ABC Family original movie. In 2012, Watson appeared on Gossip Girl as Serena Van der Woodsen's boyfriend.

Watson has continued to land acting roles in recent years. In 2014, he enjoyed guest-starring roles on the television shows Masters of Sex and Hart of Dixie. He also starred in the television movies Far from Home and The Santa Con.

In 2019, Watson starred in the Showtime drama The Loudest Voice, which tells the story of Roger Ailes and the rise of Fox News. Watson plays the son of media mogul and owner of News Corp, Rupert Murdoch.

Personal life
Watson was diagnosed with Hodgkin's lymphoma in May 2002 and took a leave of absence from 7th Heaven while he underwent treatment. As of April 2003, it was reportedly in remission, and he began appearing on the program again, starting with the 150th episode.

Watson has been married three times. His first marriage was to Laura Payne-Gabriel, whom he met through actress Tori Spelling. He and Tracy Hutson had their first son in May 2005, and their second son in November 2007, Felix Watson. They parted in 2010. In May 2012, Watson and girlfriend Natasha Gregson Wagner, daughter of actress Natalie Wood, had a daughter. They married on December 21, 2014.

Filmography

Film

Television

References

External links

American male film actors
American male television actors
1974 births
Living people
Male actors from Michigan
Male actors from Dallas
People from Richardson, Texas
People from Topanga, California
People from Traverse City, Michigan
20th-century American male actors
21st-century American male actors